Novak Mićović (born 25 October 2001) is a Serbian professional footballer who plays as a goalkeeper for Čukarički.

References

External links
 
 

2001 births
Living people
Association football goalkeepers
Serbian footballers
Serbian First League players
Serbian SuperLiga players
FK IMT players
FK Čukarički players
People from Belgrade